My Own is an American dating reality television series that aired on MTV in 2006. The show featured a person obsessed with a celebrity, and a group of six contestants competing to win a date with the obsessed person.

The show
The show starts with the introduction of the person who is seeking his/her singer. Then, two friends of him/her introduce themselves and the chooser,  afterwards they head to the "My Own" studio, where they meet the six challengers. 
Then the trivia round starts. In this round the contestants have to answer trivia questions about the singer, followed by a mini singing and dancing round. After this round, the "chooser" chooses four contestants to pass to the next round.
In the second round, the contestants show their houses and talk a bit about their hobbies and tastes, followed by a competition that involves something that has to with the celebrity in cause. Afterwards the chooser eliminates one contestant. 
The final three contestants perform their favorite song of the artist in cause while dressed like in the music video.

The choreographer for the show was Chantal Robson.

Artists featured
Celebrities who were featured in searches for a partner include:
 50 Cent
 Ashanti
 Natasha Bedingfield
 Beyoncé 
 Mary J. Blige
 Mariah Carey
 Cézanne
 Ciara
 Kelly Clarkson
 Hilary Duff
 Fergie
 Brandon Flowers
 Dave Grohl
 Nick Lachey
 Avril Lavigne
 Adam Levine
 Jennifer Lopez
 Joel Madden 
 Nelly
 Omarion
 P.Diddy
 Pink
 Rihanna
 Nicole Scherzinger 
 Ashlee Simpson
 Jessica Simpson
 Shakira
 Britney Spears
 Justin Timberlake
 Kanye West
 Deryck Whibley

References

External links
Official Website

MTV original programming
2006 American television series debuts
2000s American reality television series